Fahad Al Hajeri (born 10 November 1991) is a Kuwaiti professional footballer who plays as a centre back for Al-Ettifaq on from loan Kuwait SC and for the Kuwait national team.

Career 
On 16 October 2012, Al Hajeri made his international debut against the Philippines. He scored his first goal against Lebanon. He was selected in Kuwait's squad for the 2015 AFC Asian Cup.

International goals
Scores and results list Kuwait's goal tally first.

References

External links 
 

1991 births
Living people
Association football defenders
Kuwaiti footballers
Kuwait international footballers
2015 AFC Asian Cup players
Ettifaq FC players
Saudi Professional League players
Expatriate footballers in Saudi Arabia
Kuwait SC players
Kuwaiti expatriate sportspeople in Saudi Arabia
Kuwait Premier League players
Kuwaiti expatriate footballers
Al Salmiya SC players